Ophiclinops is a genus of clinids native to the coast of southern Australia.

Species
There are currently three recognized species in this genus:
 Ophiclinops hutchinsi A. George & V. G. Springer, 1980 (Earspot snakeblenny)
 Ophiclinops pardalis (McCulloch & Waite, 1918) (Spotted snakeblenny)
 Ophiclinops varius (McCulloch & Waite, 1918) (Variegated snake-blenny)

References

 
Clinidae
Taxa named by Gilbert Percy Whitley